Mads Hansen may refer to:

Mads Hansen (ice hockey) (born 1978), Norwegian ice hockey player
Mads Hansen (footballer, born 1984), Norwegian footballer
Mads Hansen (footballer, born 2001), Danish footballer
Mads Hansen (footballer, born 2002), Danish footballer
Mads Hansen (speedway rider) (born 2000), Danish speedway rider